West Compton is a hamlet and civil parish in the county of Dorset, England. It lies in western Dorset, about 7 miles to the east of the town of Bridport. The county town of Dorchester lies about 9 miles east-southeast. The A35 trunk road, which runs between these two towns, is about 2 miles to the south. Dorset County Council estimate that in 2013 the parish had a population of 24.

The hamlet is sited 160 metres above sea-level at the head of a small valley, formed by a tributary of the River Frome. The surrounding chalk hills are part of the westerly edge of the Dorset Downs, which here reach a height of 252 metres at Eggardon Hill, just over a mile to the west.

References

External links

Villages in Dorset